Oak Hill Country Club is a country club in the northeastern United States, located in Pittsford, New York, a suburb southeast of Rochester. Founded  in 1901 and best known for its East golf course, the club has hosted multiple major championships.

History
The clubhouse was no more than a converted farm house. However, at the time golf was a relatively new sport in America, and as popularity of the sport grew, so did the country club.

By 1921, Oak Hill had doubled in size and had a new clubhouse, so when the University of Rochester proposed a land swap in 1921, it was a tough decision for members. However, the country club decided to take the university up on their offer, and moved the club to a  plot in nearby Pittsford.

This decision ended up benefiting Oak Hill, the University of Rochester, and the City of Rochester. Now with triple the land of the old country club, Oak Hill had room for two 18-hole courses. Designed by Donald Ross, they became the East Course and the West Course. Local physician and civic personality John Ralston Williams cultivated oak trees and planted tens of thousands of them among the fairways and roughs on what once was a farmed-out field.

East Course
The East Course — which hosts the major tournaments — is built around the east branch of Allen Creek, which acts as a lateral hazard on 9 of its 18 holes. It has had several changes made over the years, first by Robert Trent Jones, Sr. in the early 1960s, later (and more recently for the 1989 Open and 2003 PGA) by Tom Fazio and his design group and finally by Andrew Green who completed a restoration project in 2019.

In 1941, the Times-Union, a local paper at the time, posted a $5,000 purse which attracted the greatest golfers in the world, including names such as Sam Snead, Walter Hagen, and Ben Hogan. This tournament, won by Snead, put Oak Hill on the national golf map.  Several prestigious tournaments were held at Oak Hill over the next 78 years, including six men's major championships – including three U.S. Opens and three PGA Championships, as well as the Ryder Cup.

In 2019, the East Course was ranked 22nd in Golf Digests list of America's 100 Greatest Golf Courses.

Major tournaments hosted
All played on the East Course.Bolded years' major championships on PGA Tour.

Upon the completion of the 2008 Senior PGA Championship, Oak Hill Country Club is the only club in the United States to have hosted all six of the men's major championships that move around the country.

The course record of 63 is by Jason Dufner, in the second round of the 2013 PGA Championship.

Future events

References

External links

2003 PGA Championship
2013 PGA Championship
Hole by Hole Guide from 2013 PGA Championship
Complete Course Layout

Golf clubs and courses in New York (state)
Golf clubs and courses designed by Donald Ross
Ryder Cup venues
Sports in Rochester, New York
Sports venues in Monroe County, New York
1901 establishments in New York (state)